Dancing In the Dark is a 1949 Technicolor musical comedy film directed by Irving Reis, starring William Powell and Mark Stevens. Betsy Drake's singing voice was dubbed by Bonnie Lou Williams.

Plot

This musical comedy stars William Powell as Emery Slade, an unlikeable actor who was once a major film star, but who has not worked in ten years. Slade tries to convince studio chief Melville Crossman (Adolphe Menjou) to give the female lead in the film version of a Broadway musical to an unknown, rather than the actress he was sent to New York to sign.

Cast
 William Powell as Emery Slade
 Mark Stevens as Bill Davis
 Betsy Drake as Julie Clarke
 Adolphe Menjou as Melville Crossman
 Randy Stuart as Rosalie Brooks
 Lloyd Corrigan as John Barker
 Hope Emerson as Mrs. Schlaghammer
 Walter Catlett as Joe Brooks
 Don Beddoe as Barney Bassett
 Jean Hersholt as Jean Hersholt

References

External links 
 
 
 

1949 films
1949 musical comedy films
1949 romantic comedy films
American musical comedy films
American romantic comedy films
American romantic musical films
Films about actors
American films based on plays
Films directed by Irving Reis
20th Century Fox films
1940s romantic musical films
1940s American films